The 2003 SEAT Cupra Championship season was the inaugural running of the one-make championship. The championship consisted of ten rounds at five meetings held in England, beginning on 4 May at Croft, and finishing at Thruxton on 17 August. The championship winner was rewarded with a drive in the British Touring Car Championship for the SEAT Sport UK team. Robert Huff would eventually win the championship, holding off both Gordon Shedden and Stefan Hodgetts, as those three drivers shared nine of the ten race victories between them. Huff would go on to finish seventh in the 2004 British Touring Car Championship with his prize-winning drive.

Teams and drivers
All entries ran the Mk1 SEAT León entered by SEAT themselves.

Calendar

Championship Standings
 Points were awarded as follows:

External links
 2003 season results on the SEAT Sport UK website 

SEAT Cupra Championship
SEAT Cupra Championship seasons